Tell It to the Judge is a 1949 American romantic comedy film directed by Norman Foster and starring Rosalind Russell as a divorcee who tries to get back her ex-husband, played by Robert Cummings.

Plot
Appointed to be a federal judge, Marsha Meredith (Rosalind Russell) is questioned by a U.S. Senate committee, specifically about her divorce from lawyer Peter Webb (Robert Cummings).

She returns home to Palm Beach, Florida, where soon Peter shows up to depose showgirl Ginger Simmons (Marie McDonald) for his defense of gangster George Ellerby (Douglass Dumbrille). In a fit of jealousy at spotting her ex-husband with another woman, Marsha picks up Alexander Darvac (Gig Young) in a bar and accompanies him to a gambling spot, which is raided.

Peter helps her escape notoriety. They steal a boat and hide out in a lighthouse, where they rekindle their romance. They remarry, but her grandfather, Judge Meredith (Harry Davenport), persuades them not to publicize that fact until the Senate confirms her appointment.

Ellerby jumps bail. Ginger tries to take Peter to him and they are seen again by Marsha, who is furious. She invents a story to reporters, who have heard rumors about Marsha's new marriage. She claims she wed a man named Roogle (Clem Bevans) who died on their wedding night.

Marsha goes to her friend Kitty's cabin in the mountains to get away from the limelight. Peter, to get even, announces that Roogle is alive and on his way. Marsha ends up asking Darvac to pretend to be Roogle, but has to knock out Darvac when he tries to claim his privileges as her "husband."

In the end, after the confusion is sorted out, Marsha decides that if she has to choose, being married to Peter would make her happier than her career. She comes home and finds Ginger and Darvac knocked out in the closet.

Cast
 Rosalind Russell as Marsha Meredith
 Robert Cummings as Peter B. Webb
 Gig Young as Alexander Darvac
 Marie McDonald as Ginger Simmons
 Harry Davenport as Judge MacKenzie Meredith
 Fay Baker as Valerie Hobson
 Katherine Warren as Kitty Lawton
 Douglass Dumbrille as George Ellerby
 Clem Bevans as Alonzo K. Roogle
 Grandon Rhodes as Ken Craig
 Maggie Hathaway as Maid
 Thurston Hall as Sen. Caswell (uncredited) 
 Larry Steers as Bar Patron (uncredited) 
 Ben Welden as Augie (uncredited)

Production
The title was originally What My Next Husband Will Be and was announced in June 1948 as a vehicle for Lucille Ball. By October the lead had gone to Rosalind Russell. In November Buddy Adler was attached to produce. Filming was to begin in January with John Lund discussed as co-star. Norman Foster signed to direct in December 1948. Then Fred MacMurray agreed to co star.

The title was changed to Tell it to the Judge in April 1949, by which time Bob Cummings signed to star.

Norman Foster directed the film which started 5 April. In May 1949 Charles Vidor was called in to direct re-takes.

References

External links
 
 
 
 

1949 films
American romantic comedy films
American black-and-white films
Films directed by Norman Foster
Columbia Pictures films
1940s English-language films
1949 romantic comedy films
1940s American films